Jaan Tallinn (born 14 February 1972) is an Estonian billionaire computer programmer and investor known for his participation in the development of Skype and file-sharing application FastTrack/Kazaa. Jaan Tallinn is a leading figure in the field of existential risk, having co-founded both the Centre for the Study of Existential Risk (CSER), and the Future of Life Institute.

Life
Jaan Tallinn graduated from the University of Tartu in 1996 with a BSc in theoretical physics with a thesis that considered travelling interstellar distances using warps in space-time.

Tallinn founded Bluemoon in Estonia alongside schoolmates Ahti Heinla and Priit Kasesalu. Bluemoon's Kosmonaut became, in 1989 (SkyRoads is the 1993 remake), the first Estonian game to be sold abroad, and earned the company US$5,000. By 1999, Bluemoon faced bankruptcy; its founders decided to acquire remote jobs for the Swedish Tele2 at a salary of US$330 each per day. The Tele2 project, "Everyday.com", was a commercial flop. Subsequently, while working as a stay-at-home father, Tallinn developed FastTrack and Kazaa for Niklas Zennström and Janus Friis (formerly of Tele2). Kazaa's P2P technology was later repurposed to drive Skype around 2003. Tallinn sold his shares in Skype in 2005, when it was purchased by eBay.

In 2014, he invested in the reversible debugging software for app development Undo. He also made an early investment in DeepMind which was purchased by Google in 2014 for $600 million. Other investments include Faculty, a British AI startup focused on tracking terrorists, and Pactum, an "autonomous negotiation" startup based in California and Estonia.

According to sources cited by the Wall Street Journal, Tallinn loaned Sam Bankman-Fried about $100 million, and had recalled the loan by 2018.

He is married, with children.

Other tenures 
 Member of the Board of Sponsors of the Bulletin of the Atomic Scientists
 Former member of the Estonian President's Academic Advisory Board.
 Co-founder of the personalized medical research company MetaMed.

Tallinn participates in the effective altruism movement and donated $604,500 to the effective altruism associated Machine Intelligence Research Institute since 2015. In addition, his initial donation, in 2012, when co-founding the Centre for the Study of Existential Risk was around $200,000.

Views
Tallinn strongly promotes the study of existential risk and has given numerous talks on this topic. His main worries are related to artificial intelligence, unknowns coming from technological development, and biological risk. He believes humanity is not spending enough resources on long-term planning and mitigating threats that could wipe us out as a species. He has been a supporter of the Rationalist movement. He has also contributed to Chatham House, supporting their work on the nuclear threat.

References

External links
 Interview Series with Jaan Tallinn
 Ambient Sound Investments - Jaan Tallinn's Profile
 Bluemoon Interactive
 The Guardian profile on Estonia by Jaan Tallinn
 Jaan Tallinn's Metamed Profile
 Jaan Tallinn does a Reddit AMA

1972 births
Living people
Estonian computer programmers
People from Tallinn
University of Tartu alumni
Recipients of the Order of the White Star, 5th Class
Skype people